FC Serrières is a football club from Neuchâtel, Switzerland; the club was founded in 1951, and is currently playing in the 2. Liga Interregional.

Players

Managers

Presidents

Honours

Domestic

League
None

Cups
None

External links 
 

Football clubs in Switzerland
Association football clubs established in 1951
1951 establishments in Switzerland